Stefan Rzadzinski (born January 5, 1993) is a Canadian racing driver from Edmonton, Alberta.

Rzadzinski won several regional karting titles and placed highly in many major American national karting championships from 2002 to 2008. In 2009 and 2010 he raced in the Ontario Formula Ford 1600 championship and placed second both years. He signed on with Davey Hamilton Racing to take a significant step up and make his Firestone Indy Lights debut in the series' 2011 double-header in Rzadzinski's hometown of Edmonton. Rzadzinski finished 10th and 13th in the two races, good enough for 37 points and 24th in the championship. He also participated in the 2011 Skip Barber Summer Series where he finished fifth with two wins in 16 races. In 2012 he signed with JDC MotorSports to race in the Star Mazda Championship. He competed in ten of the 17 races and finished 16th in points with a best finish of sixth in his home race in Edmonton.

In 2014 he ran 4 races in NASCAR Canadian Tire Series with a best finish of 9th.

Rzadzinski's nickname in the paddock is "Razzle Dazzle".

Motorsports career results

American open-wheel racing results
(key)

Indy Lights

Star Mazda Championship

U.S. F2000 National Championship

NASCAR
(key) (Bold – Pole position awarded by qualifying time. Italics – Pole position earned by points standings or practice time. * – Most laps led.)

Canadian Tire Series

IMSA GT3 Cup Challenge Canada

References

External links
 

1993 births
Living people
Indy Lights drivers
NASCAR drivers
Indy Pro 2000 Championship drivers
Racing drivers from Alberta
Sportspeople from Edmonton
U.S. F2000 National Championship drivers

JDC Motorsports drivers
Techeetah drivers
Team Pelfrey drivers
Michelin Pilot Challenge drivers